Abortion in Sweden was first legislated by the Abortion Act of 1938. This stated that an abortion could be legally performed in Sweden upon medical, humanitarian, or eugenical grounds. That is, if the pregnancy constituted a serious threat to the woman's life, if she had been impregnated by rape, or if there was a considerable chance that any serious condition might be inherited by her child, she could request an abortion. The law was later augmented in 1946 to include socio-medical grounds and again in 1963 to include the risk of serious fetal damage. A committee investigated whether these conditions were met in each individual case and, as a result of this prolonged process, abortion was often not granted until the middle of the second trimester. As such, a new law was created in 1974, stating that the choice of an abortion is entirely up to the woman until the end of the 18th week.

Legislation

Current
The current legislation is the Abortion Act of 1974 (SFS 1974:595). This states that up until the end of the eighteenth week of the pregnancy, the choice of an abortion is entirely up to the woman, for any reason whatsoever. After the 18th, a woman needs a permission from the National Board of Health and Welfare (Socialstyrelsen) to have an abortion. Permission for these late abortions is usually granted for cases in which the fetus or mother are unhealthy. Abortion is not allowed if the fetus is viable, which generally means that abortions after the 22nd week are not allowed. However, abortions after the 22nd week may be allowed in the rare cases where the fetus can not survive outside the womb even if it is carried to term.

The issue is largely settled in Sweden, and the question of the legality of abortion is not a highly controversial political issue.

Consensus in Sweden is in favour of preventing unwanted pregnancies by the use of birth control and the primary goal is not to lower the amount of abortions, but rather the goal is that all children that are born should be wanted. The number of abortions statistically follows the number of pregnancies. In comparison with the other nordic countries, Sweden ranks high in number of abortions, and low in number of young parents, while the number of pregnancies in relation to total population is largely the same in all Nordic countries.

History

The Civil Code of 1734 formally introduced the death penalty for abortion, but there is no confirmed case in which this sentence was actually carried out: the attention was focused on infanticide rather than abortion, and the court cases were few.  The reformed law of 1864 abolished the death penalty for abortion and replaced it with between two and six years of penal labour for both the patient who received the abortion, as well as for the abortion provider.

During the second half of the 19th century, abortion court cases became more common and the issue became a part of public debate. A reform in 1921 replaced the penal labour with a shorter prison term without penal labour for the patient, but kept the original penalty for the abortion service provider. 
Between 1929 and 1933, around 21 patients annually were sentenced for abortion, and the vast majority was given suspended sentences.

The first law on legal abortions was passed in Sweden in 1938 when the law legalized abortion on a very limited scale, and only on serious medical consideration, after evaluation by the Royal Board of Health. From 1946 abortions could also be permitted on social medicinal grounds. During the 1960s, a successive change in Swedish society took place, and the general attitude towards sexuality, as well as abortion, became more liberal. This, among other things, led to an increase in the number of permitted abortions.

The current Abortion Act (SFS 1974:595 with later amendments in 1995 and 2007) entered into force on 1 January 1975. It permits abortion on the request of the pregnant woman until the 18th week, and thereafter only in cases of severe indications of medical risk. After the 18th week, abortions can only be performed after an evaluation by the National Board of Health and Welfare.

In 1989, the Board issued general advice on implementation of the law (SOSFS 1989:6). From 1 September 2004, these were superseded by new advice and policy (SOSFS 2004:4).

Since 1 January 2008, foreign patients – including asylum applicants, non-permanent residents, and those not registered in Sweden – are allowed to get an abortion in the country. During 2009, 132 such abortions were performed in Sweden. The National Board of Health and Welfare called this a comparably small figure, in relation to the total number of abortions.

Statistics
The National Board of Health and Welfare is the central national authority for social services, public health, and the health services in Sweden. Among the board's responsibilities are evaluation and monitoring of abortions performed in Sweden, as well as establishing norms by issuing provisions and general advice. The board is also responsible for the collection and publishing of official national statistics on abortions. Until 1995 reports were instead published by Statistics Sweden.

Statistical reports are published yearly and are based on data from all clinics and hospitals where abortions are performed. Data is collected on the age of the women, earlier pregnancies and abortions, the length of the pregnancy at the time of abortion, method of abortion, and where the abortion was performed.

One of the National Health Board's main purposes with these reports is to measure changes and trends over time. The statistics on legal abortions stretches back to 1955 and, starting from 1975, data on frequencies for different age groups are available. From 1985 the women's home municipality was also recorded.

Trends
The number of induced abortions performed in Sweden rose markedly on a yearly basis from the early 1960s, but soon leveled off following the liberalization of the abortion law in 1975. It is not possible to tell whether the increase in the statistics after the Abortion Act of 1974 reflects actual circumstances, or just bias resulting from an increased will to report abortions after legalization. Since 1975, the total yearly number of cases has averaged between 30,000 and 38,000 abortions. 
 
The number of abortions by age group were as follows: those performed on teenagers in 1975 were 30 in every 1,000, while those performed on women aged 20 to 24 years old was 27 in every 1,000. However, since 1977, the opposite has held true, with fewer abortions being performed on teenagers than women aged 20 to 24. The number of abortions among teenagers was around 11 per 1,000 women in 2018, a halving since 2009.

Most abortions in Sweden are performed on women aged 25–29 years old, followed in order by the age groups 20–24 years old, 30–34 years old, 35–39 years old, 15–19 years old (teenage abortions), and 40–44 years old. Before the age of thirty most women have not established a family life and abortion is more common amongst this age group, with multiple sex partners in the younger age groups parenthood is less desired and abortion more likely. The fact that most women in the younger age groups are still studying, combined with them being new on the labour market, influences the choice to perform abortion.

Although abortion rates vary widely in Sweden, according to geographical region, the highest rate of teenage abortions is registered in Gotland and in the metropolitan areas of Stockholm and Gothenburg. The lowest incidences are in the counties of Blekinge, Kronoberg, and Jönköping.

In 2018, 84 percent of the induced abortions were performed before the end of the 9th week of pregnancy and 57 percent before the end of the 7th week, compared to 55 and 10 percent respectively in 1994. The proportion of medical abortions constituted 93 percent of all abortions.

Debate 
Sweden has one of the most liberal abortion laws in the world. As mentioned previously, the topic itself does not have much controversy among the society and majority of Swedish population supports the law and policies around it.

However, there are political debates surrounding the cut-off period for abortion as well as other abortion rights. Right-wing conservative parties like the Christian Democrats and Swedish Democrats have earlier promoted a stricter ban on late abortions, but do no longer do so. The Swedish Association for Sexuality Education has responded by stating that a lot of political arguments stem from misinformation and lack of knowledge.

Abortion rights

Organizations 
RFSU stands for abortion rights to all women, it is one of their main worldwide priority areas. They believe that in an equal and sustainable society individuals have a right over their own body, sexuality and reproduction.

Anti-abortion

Organizations 
Människorätt för ofödda (MRO) (Human rights for the unborn) is politically and religiously independent organization. They aim to promote right to life for those unborn by non-violent protests, showing pictures of fetuses, and supporting pregnant women.

Ja till livet (Yes to life) is a non-profit organization which aims to influence the debate on human dignity within abortion, fetal diagnoses and elderly care. Their goal is to limit the abortions by showing that fetuses have a human value.

Some religious organizations have anti-abortion stand too. The Catholic Church believes that human life is created at the point of conception, thus abortion should not be permitted unless both mother and the child are in danger. A Catholic movement, Respekt (Respect), aims to promote human life from conception to death, meaning that, among other positions, they stand against abortions and euthanasia.

Ellinor Grimmark 
In 2014, a controversial lawsuit was launched by a midwife Ellinor Grimmark against the health authorities in Jönköping region because they refused to provide her with a job as she would not carry out abortions or prescribe contraceptives due to her religious beliefs. The case had financial support from a well-known Christian anti-abortion organisation in the US, Alliance Defending Freedom, which has interests in limiting abortion access in Europe. Grimmark's case was tried by the discrimination ombudsman as well as a district court in Sweden, both of which ruled against her. The same decision was reached in the Swedish Labor court after which Grimmark decided to proceed to the European Court of Human Rights. In 2020, she lost her case against Swedish state, and in October 2021, the case was permanently closed when her motion for appeal was denied.

See also 
Swedish Association for Sexuality Education

Notes

References

External links 
 Swedish Parliament – Abortion act 

1938 establishments in Sweden
Sweden
Health law in Sweden
Society of Sweden
Sweden
Women's rights in Sweden